Cartosat-2F is the eighth satellite in the Cartosat-2 Series. It is an Earth observation satellite launched on the PSLV-C40 mission by the Indian Space Research Organisation (ISRO).

History 
Originally, Cartosat-2E was published as the last Cartosat-2 satellite to be launched, as Cartosat-3 Series spacecraft were scheduled to launch in 2018. Cartosat-2F was first listed on launch schedules as Cartosat-2ER, a name possibly indicating it was originally a replica of Cartosat-2E to be used as a spare.

Satellite description 
Like other satellites in the series, Cartosat-2F was built on an IRS-2 bus. It uses reaction wheels, magnetorquers, and hydrazine-fueled reaction control thrusters for stability. It has a design service life of five years. Cartosat-2F has three main remote sensing instruments, a panchromatic camera called PAN, a four channel visible/near infrared radiometer called HRMX, and a Event Monitoring camera (EvM).

 Event Monitoring camera (EvM) is also capable of capturing minute long video of a fixed spot as well, Event Monitoring camera (EvM) for frequent high-resolution land observation of selected areas.

Launch 
The PSLV-C40 launch was initially placed on hiatus following failures with the nose cone and satellite deployment systems of PSLV-C39, but was cleared to launch once these issues were resolved. It was launched at 03:59 UTC from First Launch Pad at Satish Dhawan Space Centre on 12 January 2018, the third of the series to be launched within a year. After 16 minutes and 37 seconds, Cartosat-2F was separated from the launch vehicle, and the ISRO Telemetry, Tracking and Command Network (ITTCN) took control of the satellite for maneuvers to its desired orbit. The launch also marked the 100th satellite successfully put into orbit by the ISRO.

Mission 
The first image returned by the mission, on 15 January 2018; was of Holkar Stadium and the surrounding community in Indore, Madhya Pradesh. The PAN camera is designed to have a spatial resolution less than one meter and a swath width of ten kilometers.

On 27 November 2020, at 01:49 UTC, Cartosat-2F and Russia's Kanopus-V No.3 spacecraft came very close while in orbit, passing each other at distance of nearly 200 to 450 meters.

References 

Cartosat
Spacecraft launched by India in 2018
Spacecraft launched by PSLV rockets
January 2018 events in India